Taxi Blues (translit. Taksi-Blyuz) is a 1990 Soviet drama film directed by Pavel Lungin. It was entered into the 1990 Cannes Film Festival where Lungin won the award for Best Director. The film was selected as the Soviet entry for the Best Foreign Language Film at the 63rd Academy Awards, but was not accepted as a nominee.

Plot
Shlykov, a hard-working taxi driver and Lyosha, a saxophonist, develop a bizarre love-hate relationship, and despite their prejudices, realize they aren't so different after all.

Cast
 Pyotr Mamonov as Lyosha
 Pyotr Zaychenko as Shlykov
 Vladimir Kashpur as Old Nechiporenko
 Natalya Kolyakanova as Christina
 Hal Singer as himself
 Yelena Safonova as Nina, Liocha's Wife
 Sergei Gazarov as Administrator
 Yevgeni Gerchakov as Bald Musician in the Taxi
 Dmitri Prigov as Writer Typing in the Train
 Igor Zolotovitsky as Petyunchik
 Valeri Khlevinsky as Fat Kolya
 Yelena Stepanova as Smart Young Girl
 Vladimir Sterzhakov as Musician in the Taxi
 Konstantin Afonsky as Long-Haired Mechanic
 Aleksandr Buyanov as Passenger with Newspaper
 Lidiya Yezhevskaya as 'Mousy' Valya

Reception
Taxi Blues has an approval rating of 83% on review aggregator website Rotten Tomatoes, based on 6 reviews, and an average rating of 6/10.

See also
 List of submissions to the 63rd Academy Awards for Best Foreign Language Film
 List of Soviet submissions for the Academy Award for Best Foreign Language Film

References

External links

1990 films
1990 drama films
1990s Russian-language films
Films directed by Pavel Lungin
Films about taxis
Films set in Moscow
Films shot in Moscow
Films set in the Soviet Union
Jazz films
Russian drama films
Soviet drama films